Boz Scaggs & Band is the fourth album by Boz Scaggs, and his second on the Columbia Records label. It was released in December 1971.

Track listing 
All tracks written by Boz Scaggs, except where indicated.

Side One
 "Monkey Time" (Scaggs, Clive Arrowsmith)
 "Runnin' Blue" (Scaggs, Pat O'Hara)
 "Up to You" (Scaggs, Arrowsmith)
 "Love Anyway"
 "Flames of Love" (Scaggs, Arrowsmith)

Side Two
 "Here to Stay"
 "Nothing Will Take Your Place"
 "Why Why" (Scaggs, Tim Davis)
 "You're So Good"

Personnel
Boz Scaggs – lead vocals, guitar
Mel Martin – tenor, alto and baritone saxophones, flute
Tom Poole – trumpet, flugelhorn
Pat O'Hara – trombone
Doug Simril – guitar, piano
Joachim Young	 – organ, piano, vibraphone
David Brown – bass
George Rains – drums, percussion
Additional personnel
Chepito Areas – congas and timbales on "Flames of Love"
Michael Carabello – congas and timbales on "Flames of Love"
Lee Charleton – saw and harp on "Here to Stay"
Rita Coolidge Ensemble – backing vocals on "Flames of Love"
Dorothy Morrison – backing vocals on "Flames of Love"
Technical
Clive Arrowsmith - photography

References

External links
Boz Scaggs and Band Lyrics

1971 albums
Boz Scaggs albums
Albums produced by Glyn Johns
Columbia Records albums
Albums produced by Boz Scaggs
Albums recorded at Olympic Sound Studios